The M19 is a short metropolitan route in Johannesburg, South Africa.

Route 
The M19 begins at the R29 and ends at the M38.

References 

Streets and roads of Johannesburg
Metropolitan routes in Johannesburg